"Shed a Light" is a song by German DJ and record producer Robin Schulz and French DJ and music producer David Guetta, featuring American electronic music DJ trio Cheat Codes. The song was released as a digital download in Germany on 25 November 2016 as the lead single from Schulz's third studio album Uncovered (2017). It was written by Schulz, Guetta, Jason Evigan, Jacob Kasher, Giorgio Tuinfort, Stefan Dabruck, John Ryan, Guido Kramer, Dennis Bierbrodt, Ammar Malik, and Jürgen Dohr.

Music video
The official music video of the song was released on 31 January 2017 through Robin Schulz's YouTube account. It was directed by Mario Clement and produced by Christopher Kane, and features actors Franziska Nylen and Christopher Reinhardt. The music video is about a male and female astronaut couple on a space mission, when the male crashes to a planet in his spaceship. His lover speeds to him in her spaceship, but he becomes surrounded by dark matter and warns her not to come closer. She does not heed his warning and goes to his side, causing both to be consumed by the matter.

Track listings

Charts

Weekly charts

Year-end charts

Certifications

Release history

References

2016 songs
2016 singles
Robin Schulz songs
David Guetta songs
Cheat Codes (DJs) songs
Songs written by David Guetta
Songs written by Giorgio Tuinfort
Songs written by Robin Schulz
Songs written by Jason Evigan
Songs written by Jacob Kasher
Songs written by John Ryan (musician)
Songs written by Ammar Malik
Song recordings produced by David Guetta
Songs written by Jürgen Dohr